David Smolansky Urosa (born 27 May 1985) is a Venezuelan politician, journalist, one of the leaders of the Popular Will party and former Mayor of El Hatillo municipality in Caracas, Venezuela for the period 2014–2017. He was recognized by the Junior Chamber International as World's Outstanding Young Politician 2015. Threatened with prison, he has been in exile since 13 September 2017. He was described by Americas Quarterly as the politician among ten people who would someday help rebuild Venezuela.

Life

Smolansky is a second generation descendant of immigrants who left the Communist bloc. His grandparents fled Ukraine when it was part of the Soviet Union and settled in Cuba where they lived for 43 years; in 1970 they escaped from Cuba to Venezuela when his father was 13 years old. The son of a Jewish father and a Catholic mother, he received a multicultural and multireligious family education.

In February 2019, Donald Trump presented the former mayor ("one of the youngest mayors in Venezuelan history") to a Miami crowd of fellow Venezuelan expatriates with the following words: "Sadly, David is the third generation of his family to flee the agony of socialism and communism. David’s grandparents fled the Soviet Union in 1927, and his father fled communist Cuba in 1970." The US president added that"As David said, 'The difference I want to have from my father and grandfather is to go back to my country.' [Applause] 'My grandparents never went back to Kiev… my father has not been back to Havana. I hope I can [soon] return to Venezuela.' [Applause] I think that will happen, David.”

Education
Smolansky completed elementary school and high school in U.E. Colegio El Penon (IEA), received his degree in Journalism at the Andres Bello Catholic University, then did a Masters in Political Science at Simon Bolivar University. He later received a scholarship in Georgetown University for the Global Competitiveness Leadership Program.

Political life
Beginnings in politics

Smolansky began his public appearances as one of the college students who led the protest against the kidnapping and murder of the Faddoul brothers in Caracas. Subsequently, he became one of the leaders of the student movement that protested against the closure of Radio Caracas Television (RCTV) to claim the right to freedom of expression which would afterwards win the elections in 2007, in which was rejected Venezuelan President Hugo Chávez' proposal to reform the Constitution. In 2009, the elections known as Constitutional Referendum 2009 occurred in which Smolansky actively participated from the student leadership in the months before the elections, in the various protests and student demonstrations in rejection of the presidential proposal and the election day with the deployment to serve as board members and witnesses.

Popular Will Party and Democratic Unity Roundtable

After having completed his studies, he began his political career in the beginnings of the Democratic Unity Roundtable where he joined its communications team. At the same time, in 2009 he became a founding member of the Popular Will Party in which he served as national manager of the youth division and was subsequently chosen as a member of the national leadership of the party with more than 60 thousand votes in open primaries (being the second highest vote). Being a Popular Will activist and a member of the Popular Democratic Unity Roundtable, he actively participated in the 2012 electoral processes, both primary and presidential and then regional.

Race for El Hatillo

On 14 July 2013, primary elections were done inside the Popular Will Party for the office of Mayor in El Hatillo, faced David Smolansky against Eduardo Battistini, winning with 514 votes against 350, translated into 59%. Later that year, in December elections were participating Miguel Mariño for the Venezuela's United Socialist Party, Elias Sayegh for Primero Justicia party, Diana D'Agostini for Accion Democratica party and David Smolansky for the Popular Will party; the last three were all candidates for the Democratic Unity Roundtable coalition (DUR), this was due El Hatillo being the only municipality within the metropolitan area of Caracas where there was no consensus on a single candidate by the DUR. Smolansky was victorious with 13,607 votes or 44.24% and a comfortable margin of 12.8 points over Sayegh who obtained 9,567 votes (31.11%), both above Mariño who would get the third place with 3,520 votes or 11.44%.

Recent Years

In 2014, following his election as mayor, he was one of the founders of the Mayors Association for Venezuela, as a member of the directive, which aims to make common front ( including all mayors belonging to the Roundtable) against problems of the country, marked by the Association itself as " fighting together against government measures that are dragging Venezuela into the abyss".In October, 2015, David Smolansky received the Heinz Sonntag Youth Prize 2015-2017 awarded by the Hannah Arendt Observatory in recognition of his career and perseverance in the defense of democratic values and peace. In November, he won the Outstanding Young Political World 2015 award, presented in the city of Kazanawa in Japan for his performance in local management and also for defending Venezuelan freedom.

Given the persecution in recent years of activists, politicians and especially mayors and former mayors who oppose the government of Nicolas Maduro, Smolansky has placed special emphasis on the defense of political prisoners and decentralization in Venezuela. Currently in Venezuela there are about 77 mayors from the political opposition with open legal proceedings, of which David Smolansky is one of them.

El Hatillo Municipality
On 8 December 2013 he was elected El Hatillo municipality's Mayor for the period 2014–2018. In October, 2014 the Municipal Development Plan (MDP) was unveiled after consultation processes using a Participative Budget, tours and meetings with the different communities; the purpose of the Municipal Development Plan is to guide management so that there's no room for improvisation, not only sets out the main goals, but also how they should be fulfilled (referring to transparency, participation and use of modern technology) and how to get to them (human capital and financial sustainability). 
Smolansky has placed particular emphasis on generating strategic alliances with the private sector, the NGO sector and universities. So far they have materialized over 200 alliances that result in improved quality of life for hatillanos and greater institutional development for the municipality.

Municipal Plan Development

Strategic Points
Hatillo Blindado: Ensuring the safety of all residents and visitors of the municipality
Hatillo Equilibrado: To ensure an orderly and harmonious development through standards and clear rules
Vive El Hatillo: To promote coexistence and human development through meeting spaces and social management policies
Crosscutting Axes
Citizen participation: Achieve an inclusive management that fulfills the needs, visions and proposals of neighbors through commitment, co-management and shared responsibility
Transparency: Making El Hatillo municipality become one of the three most transparent municipal governments
Modernization: Provide self-management tools, access to information and participation through innovation and information technologies available to all hatillanos.
Support areas
Human Capital: Ensuring the welfare of public servants by ensuring their professional development and a good working environment.
Financial sustainability: Ensure financial availability for the fulfillment of all the Municipality's projects and long-term maintenance.

From this Municipal Development Plan, El Hatillo municipality has made significant achievements at the management level, presented in its Report and Accounts 2014, being evaluated with 73.6% approval rating as the best of Caracas:

Revitalization of public spaces.
Repeal of the Special Plan San Antonio
Kidnappings reduction in the municipality by 62%
Making the Participatory Budget for 2015 (the first in the municipality)
Increase in investing percentage in public safety by 66.7% compared to 2013; from 12% to 20%
Payment of existing debt since 2007 for Bs. 5,000,000 to teachers
Increase of 257% of HCM (Health Policy)
Debt payment in uniforms from 2007 to 2013 for Bs. 1,088,047
Program "I contribute with El Hatillo": Increased tax collection at 38.6% compared to 2013
Quality of Roads Plan 2014-2015: With a total of 45.28 km repaired. Investment: 31,606,034.54 Bs.
Open elections of the local public planning council
Endowment of more than 300 uniforms, boots and body harnesses to the municipal Fire Department.

References

Living people
People from Caracas
Venezuelan people of Polish-Jewish descent
Mayors of places in Venezuela
Popular Will politicians
Venezuelan Roman Catholics
1985 births
People of the Crisis in Venezuela
Movimiento Estudiantil (Venezuela)